BKX may refer to:

 Ticker symbol for Bankers Petroleum Inc.
 IATA symbol for Brookings Regional Airport
 Beta Kappa Chi